Bruno Leuzinger (6 January 1886 – 23 December 1952) was a Swiss ice hockey player who competed in the 1920 Summer Olympics and in the 1924 Winter Olympics.

He was born in Château-d'Œx, Vaud. In 1920 he participated with the Swiss ice hockey team in the Summer Olympic tournament. Four years later he was also a member of the Swiss team in the first Winter Olympics tournament.

References

External links
 
Bruno Leuzinger's profile at Sports Reference.com

1886 births
1952 deaths
Ice hockey players at the 1920 Summer Olympics
Ice hockey players at the 1924 Winter Olympics
Olympic ice hockey players of Switzerland
People from Château-d'Œx
Sportspeople from the canton of Vaud